Robert Owens may refer to:

 Robert Bowie Owens (1870–1940), American electric engineer who discovered alpha rays
 Robert A. Owens (1920–1942), U.S. Marine, hero of the World War II landing at Bougainville; posthumously awarded the Medal of Honor
 Robert Owens (musician) (born 1961), vocalist on Chicago house records in the 1980s
 Robert Owens (composer) (1925–2017), African-American composer, pianist, and actor
 Robert Owens (politician) (1946-2022), American politician and businessman
 Robert G. Owens Jr. (1917–2007), United States Marine general
 Bob Owens (businessman) (1921–1999), New Zealand businessman and mayor
 Bob Owens (born c. 1935), American football coach
 Bob Owens (American football, born 1946), American football coach
 Bob Owens (geologist), Welsh trilobite specialist

See also
 Robert Owen (disambiguation)